The 1995 Fort Lauderdale Strikers season was the first season of the new team in the United States Interregional Soccer League, playing in the USISL Professional League.  It was also the twenty-ninth season of the club in professional soccer.  Previously the club had fielded a team in the American Soccer League.  After they folded that team, the club joined with the Fort Lauderdale Kicks in 1994 and created this team for the 1995 season.  This year, the team finished in fourth place in the Southeast Division and did not make the playoffs.  This would be the last incarnation of the Fort Lauderdale Strikers name until the 2011 team, as the club folded this team in the same year.  The club fielded a new team known as the Florida Strikers in the 1996 season, playing in the USISL Premier League.

Background

Review

Competitions

USISL Professional League regular season

 Regulation win = 6 points
 Shootout win (SW) = 4 points
 Shootout loss (SL) = 2 points
 Regulation loss = 0 points
 Bonus points (BP): An additional one-point per goal up to a maximum of three points per game.

Northeast Division

Coastal Conference

Capital Conference

Atlantic Division

Midwest Division

East Conference

West Conference

Southeast Division

South Central Division

Western Division

North Conference

South Conference

Northwest Division

Results summaries

Results by round

Match reports

USISL Professional League Playoffs

Bracket

Match reports

Statistics

Transfers

References 

1995
Fort Lauderdale Strikers
Fort Lauderdale Strikers